Team X is a fictional black ops team appearing in American comic books published by Marvel Comics.

Comics
In the Marvel Universe, Team X was a CIA black ops team that operated during the 1960s and was linked to Weapon Plus. It was made up of Logan (James Howlett) (the future Wolverine), Victor Creed (the future Sabretooth), Mastodon, David North/Christoph Nord (Maverick), the Major Arthur Barrington, Silver Fox, Noel Higgins (Wildcat), Aldo Ferro (Vole) and John Wraith (Kestrel).

In other media

Television
 Team X appears in the X-Men: The Animated Series episode "Weapon X, Lies & Video Tape", consisting of Wolverine, Sabretooth, Silver Fox, and Maverick.
 Team X appears in Wolverine and the X-Men, consisting of Wolverine, Sabretooth, Mystique, and a brainwashed Maverick following Wolverine and Mystique's departure.

Film
 Team X appears in Hulk vs Wolverine, consisting of Sabretooth, Deadpool, Lady Deathstrike, and Omega Red.
 Team X appears in X-Men Origins: Wolverine, led by Major William Stryker and consisting of Logan, Victor Creed, Wade Wilson, Frederick Dukes, John Wraith, Chris Bradley, and Agent Zero. After everyone save for Creed and Zero question Stryker's morality and leave, Stryker and Creed set about killing the dissenters and turning Wilson into Weapon XI while Logan kills Zero.

Video games
Team X appears in the X-Men Origins: Wolverine tie-in game, consisting of Logan, Victor Creed, Wade Wilson, John Wraith, Fred Dukes, and Agent Zero.

References

Fictional secret agents and spies in comics
Comics characters introduced in 1992
X-Men supporting characters